Jonathan van der Schyff (born 23 May 1983 in Carletonville, South Africa) is a former South Africa Under-19 international rugby union player who played as a Flanker and lock for Glasgow Warriors and Currie.

Rugby Union career

Amateur career

Van der Schyff played for Currie.

Provincial and professional career

Van der Schyff played for Blue Bulls U19 and Blue Bulls U20 in the Currie Cup. He also played for Sharks in the same competition.

He played for Glasgow Warriors in the 2004–05 season.

He made one appearance in the Celtic League, playing against Newport Gwent Dragons.

He made another single appearance in that season's Heineken Cup, playing against Scarlets in Wales.

Back to South Africa for the 2006-07 season, he played for the Pumas.

International career

Van der Schyff played for South Africa U18 and South Africa U19 age grades.

References

External links
Pro12 profile
Heineken Cup profile
Hawick heading right way - The Scotsman
IT'S NOT WRIGHT; GLASGOW CLUBS IN FEUD OVER PLAYERS Hawks coach raging over Warriors' late move for his stars

1983 births
Alumni of Monument High School
Living people
Blue Bulls players
Currie RFC players
Expatriate rugby union players in Scotland
Glasgow Warriors players
Pumas (Currie Cup) players
Rugby union flankers
Rugby union locks
Rugby union players from Carletonville
Sharks (Currie Cup) players
South African expatriate rugby union players
South African expatriate sportspeople in Scotland
South African rugby union players